Ototyphlonemertidae is a family of worms belonging to the suborder Monostilifera.

Genera:
 Accirinia Tshernyshev, 1993
 Otohelicophora Envall, 1996
 Otonemertes Dawydoff, 1937
 Ototyphlonemertes Diesing, 1863

References

Monostilifera
Nemertea families